John Boulter is a British tenor best known for his appearances as a soloist in the BBC's long-running variety series The Black and White Minstrel Show. Along with bass Tony Mercer and baritone Dai Francis, Boulter was one of the show's three front men.

Early life 
Boulter was born in Gillingham, Kent, and was educated at Gillingham Grammar School and later at Number One School of Technical Training in the Royal Air Force. From there he entered the Royal Academy of Music where he won Gold, Silver and Bronze Medals for his singing, and was awarded an Associateship of the Academy in recognition of his work. He was an "apprentice Airframe Fitter" in the RAF before becoming a professional singer.

Career 
In 1960 he appeared in a South African production of Lock Up Your Daughters, and joined George Mitchell's Minstrels during the 1950s. He went on to appear in the stage and television versions of The Black and White Minstrel Show and on recordings made by the troupe. He also appeared in the 1969 spin-off series, Music Music Music, in which the minstrels appeared without their blackface make-up, following accusations of racism against the show.

Boulter appeared as the male lead – Freddie Flowerdew – in the musical production of "Ask Dad" in the Jeeves and Wooster episode, "Introduction on Broadway".

In 1973, John played Mother Goose at the Cliffs Pavilion's panto.

Family 
In 1954 he married opera singer Lorna St. Clair, with whom he had four children. Later, Boulter married West End musical star Anna Dawson.  The couple retired to New Zealand. John's daughters, Philippa (Pip) Boulter and Francesca (Frankie) Boulter, were both singers and members of the synthpop group DATA.

Recordings

As featured performer with the George Mitchell Minstrels
On Stage With The George Mitchell Minstrels (1962)
Here Come The Minstrels (1966)
Those Magnificent Minstrels (1969)

Solo
John Boulter Sings (1965)
The World's Great Love Songs (1968)
Abide With Me (1969)
John Boulter Sings The Words That Tell Of Life And Love (1976)
On Wings Of Song (1977)

References

External Links
 

English tenors
Living people
British expatriates in New Zealand
People from Gillingham, Kent
Year of birth missing (living people)